Shruthy Menon (born 19 April 1984) is an Indian actress, television host, professional Master of ceremonies and model. She is currently the anchor for Sonu Nigam's concerts worldwide as well as the show Ugram Ujwalam. In 2015, a topless photoshoot for a bridal magazine led to controversy in conservative India.

Personal life

Shruthy Menon was born to Sreevalsan Unni Menon & Shashi Menon in Mumbai. She got engaged to businessman Sahil Timbadia in 2017, with the couple getting married later in the year.

Filmography

Web series

Music video

Television career

References

External links

 

Actresses in Malayalam cinema
Actresses from Kerala
Indian film actresses
Living people
1984 births
21st-century Indian actresses
Indian television actresses
Actresses in Malayalam television